The Princess and the Clown (French:La princesse aux clowns) is a 1924 French silent film directed by André Hugon and starring Huguette Duflos, Charles de Rochefort and Magda Roche.

Cast
 Huguette Duflos as Princess Olga  
 Charles de Rochefort as The Clown  
 Magda Roche 
 Guy Favières as King Michel II 
 Paul Franceschi

References

Bibliography
 Rège, Philippe. Encyclopedia of French Film Directors, Volume 1. Scarecrow Press, 2009.

External links

1924 films
Films directed by André Hugon
French silent films
French black-and-white films
1920s French films